The 1971 winners of the Torneo di Viareggio (in English, the Viareggio Tournament, officially the Viareggio Cup World Football Tournament Coppa Carnevale), the annual youth football tournament held in Viareggio, Tuscany, are listed below.

Format
The 16 teams are organized in knockout rounds. The round of 16 are played in two-legs, while the rest of the rounds are single tie.

Participating teams
Italian teams

  Cagliari
  Fiorentina
  Inter Milan
  Juventus
  Milan
  Napoli
  Roma
  Torino

European teams

  Eintracht Frankfurt
  Dukla Praha
  Partizan Beograd
  CSKA Sofia
  Ferencváros
  Benfica
  Vojvodina
  Valencia

Tournament fixtures

Champions

Footnotes

External links
 Official Site (Italian)
 Results on RSSSF.com

1971
1970–71 in Italian football
1970–71 in Yugoslav football
1970–71 in German football
1970–71 in Czechoslovak football
1970–71 in Portuguese football
1970–71 in Spanish football
1970–71 in Bulgarian football
1970–71 in Hungarian football